The council of the Camdeboo Local Municipality was elected in 2000, 2006 and 2011 by a system of mixed-member proportional representation. Half of the councillors were elected by first-past-the-post voting from individual wards, while the other half were appointed from party lists so that the total number of party representatives was proportional to the number of votes received.

In 2016 the Camdeboo Local Municipality was merged with two others to create the Dr Beyers Naudé Local Municipality; for election results in the merged municipality see Dr Beyers Naudé Local Municipality elections.

Results 
The following table shows the composition of the council after past elections.

2000 elections

The Camdeboo Local Municipality was created in 2000, replacing the transitional local councils of Graaff-Reinet, Aberdeen and Nieu-Bethesda. The council consisted of 11 members; the ANC obtained a majority of 6.

By-elections from December 2000 to October 2002
The following by-elections were held to fill vacant ward seats in the period between the election in December 2000 and the floor crossing period in October 2002.

October 2002 floor crossing

In terms of the Eighth Amendment of the Constitution and the judgment of the Constitutional Court in United Democratic Movement v President of the Republic of South Africa and Others, in the period from 8–22 October 2002 councillors had the opportunity to cross the floor to a different political party without losing their seats. In the Camdeboo council, one councillor crossed from the Democratic Alliance (DA) to the New National Party (NNP), which had formerly been part of the DA.

September 2004 floor crossing
Another floor-crossing period occurred on 1–15 September 2004, in which the councillors from the NNP and the United Democratic Movement crossed to the ANC.

2006 elections

2011 elections

By-elections from May 2011 to August 2016
The following by-elections were held to fill vacant ward seats in the period between the election in May 2011 and the dissolution of the municipality in August 2016.

References

Municipal elections in South Africa
Elections in the Eastern Cape